Ely is a city in Linn County, Iowa. The population was 2,328 at the time of the 2020 census. It is part of the Cedar Rapids metropolitan area

History 
Ely was platted in June 1872 by T.M. Johnson. The town is named after John F. Ely, who was one of the pioneers of Linn county, a prominent railroad builder in the early days and one of the officers and stockholders of the Burlington, Cedar Rapids and Northern Railway. 

After the railroad was established in town more buildings were erected including a warehouse by Andrew Fuhrmeister, a store building by Jerry Smith, a bar, and a drug and hardware store were also built as more and more people began moving into town.

Geography 
Ely is located at  (41.875431, -91.583061).

Demographics

2010 census 
As of the census of 2010, there were 1,776 people, 628 households, and 466 families living in the city. The racial makeup of the city was 97.5% White, 0.3% African American, 0.1% Native American, 0.5% Asian, 0.6% from other races, and 1.0% from two or more races. Hispanic or Latino of any race were 2.3% of the population.

There were 628 households, of which 48.4% had children under the age of 18 living with them, 62.9% were married couples living together, 7.5% had a female householder with no husband present, 3.8% had a male householder with no wife present, and 25.8% were non-families. 18.0% of all households were made up of individuals, and 4.5% had someone living alone who was 65 years of age or older. The average household size was 2.83 and the average family size was 3.29.

The median age in the city was 33.2 years. 32.7% of residents were under the age of 18; 6.3% were between the ages of 18 and 24; 33.2% were from 25 to 44; 22.2% were from 45 to 64; and 5.7% were 65 years of age or older. The gender makeup of the city was 50.5% male and 49.5% female.

2000 census 
As of the census of 2000, there were 1,149 people, 424 households, and 315 families living in the city. The racial makeup of the city was 98.09% White, 0.35% African American, 0.26% Native American, 0.17% Asian, 0.09% from other races, and 1.04% from two or more races. Hispanic or Latino of any race were 0.96% of the population.

There were 424 households, of which 42.2% had children under the age of 18 living with them, 61.8% were married couples living together, 9.4% had a female householder with no husband present, and 25.7% were non-families. 17.9% of all households were made up of individuals, and 6.4% had someone living alone who was 65 years of age or older. The average household size was 2.71 and the average family size was 3.10.

In the city, the population was spread out, with 29.2% under the age of 18, 9.6% from 18 to 24, 34.0% from 25 to 44, 20.5% from 45 to 64, and 6.7% who were 65 years of age or older. The median age was 32 years. For every 100 females, there were 98.8 males. For every 100 females age 18 and over, there were 91.3 males.

The median income for a household in the city was $57,250, and the median income for a family was $62,500. Males had a median income of $41,292 versus $29,286 for females. The per capita income for the city was $20,936. About 2.4% of families and 5.8% of the population were below the poverty line, including 7.0% of those under age 18 and 8.5% of those age 65 or over.

Education

Public Schools 
Residents of Ely belong to the College Community School District. 
The school district operates: 
Prairie High School
Prairie Point Middle School and Ninth Grade Academy
Prairie Creek Intermediate
Prairie Heights Elementary 
Prairie View Elementary
Prairie Crest Elementary
Prairie Ridge Elementary
Prairie Hill Elementary 
The school district is located within the Cedar Rapids city limits.

Ely formerly had its own public school building, which was built in 1923, but has since ceased operations as a school and houses city government offices, City Council Chambers, a senior dining facility, meeting rooms and The History Center and archives.

Higher Education 
Ely is within 20 miles of five college campuses:

 Kirkwood Community College: 4.6 miles
 Coe College: 11.8 miles
 Mt. Mercy University: 12.7 miles
 Cornell College: 13.1 miles
 The University of Iowa: 19.5 miles

Community

Annual events 
Ely hosts the Fall Fest, held annually during Late September or Early October. The Ely Fall Fest is a family-oriented and affordable celebration that offers a wide range of events for all ages run by The Ely Parks & Recreation Commission. 
The town also hosts a city-wide garage sale day on the first Saturday of May.

Religion 
There are two churches in Ely: St. John's Lutheran Church founded in 1854 and the First Presbyterian Church founded in 1858.

Food 
Ely has numerous restaurants in Ely including Odie's Bar and Grill, My Mom's Bakery, House Divided Brewery, and Dan and Debbie's Creamery. Ely is a popular stopping point along the Cedar Valley trail.

Parks and Recreation 
The City of Ely provides four different parks throughout the community:
 Ely City Park: the newest and largest of the four city parks. It features two softball fields, soccer fields, a small pond, and playground.
 Schulte Park: locals often refer to this as the "Fishy" Park due to its large fish shaped bridge that is a part of the playground. This park features a large playground, pavilion, large grassy area, and gaga ball pit.
 Community Center Park: the oldest park in Ely, this park offers half-court basketball, a tennis court, open grass field and a playground. The playground was renovated in the fall of 2020. 
 Vavra Park: this park offers a quiet and shaded green space, nestled along a creek. Renovations were made in 2023 with new features including a covered shelter, frisbee golf holes, horse shoe pits, permanent bag toss, a butterfly garden and minimal playground equipment.

Ely is located near two Iowa State parks: Lake MacBride State Park and Palisades-Kepler State Park. The Cedar Valley Nature bike trail travels through Ely and provides access to both Iowa City and Cedar Rapids.

National Register of Historic Places 
Three properties in Ely are listed on the National Register of Historic Places:
 Dows Street Historic District
 Ely School House
 Woitishek-King-Krob Grain Elevator

Notes

References

External links 

 Historic Ely, Iowa (History of Ely & area) https://www.elyhistory.com/
 City of Ely Official Website
 Economic Development Group of Ely, nonprofit
 City Data Statistical Data and more about Ely

Cities in Iowa
Cities in Linn County, Iowa
Cedar Rapids, Iowa metropolitan area
1872 establishments in Iowa
Populated places established in 1872